The 2016 ICC Women's World Twenty20 was the fifth edition of the ICC Women's World Twenty20, the world championship of women's Twenty20 International cricket. India hosted the event for the first time, with matches played from 15 March to 3 April 2016. The tournament was run simultaneously with the men's World Twenty20, with the final of each tournament played on the same day at the same venue (at Eden Gardens, Kolkata). In the tournament final, the West Indies defeated defending champions Australia by eight wickets, claiming their first title. West Indian captain Stafanie Taylor was named Player of the Tournament, having scored more runs than any other player.

Teams and qualification
The top eight teams from the 2014 tournament earned direct qualification to the 2016 tournament. The remaining two spots were decided at the 2015 World Twenty20 Qualifier, with Bangladesh and Ireland qualifying:

Squads

Venues
On 21 July 2015, the Indian cricket board announced the name of the eight hosting cities (Bengaluru, Chennai, Dharamshala, Mohali, Mumbai, Nagpur and New Delhi) along with Kolkata, which would host the final of the event.

Warm-up matches
A total of 9 warm-up matches were played between 10 and 14 March in Bengaluru (at M. Chinnaswamy Stadium) and Chennai (at M. A. Chidambaram Stadium) featuring 9 of the tournament's 10 participating teams.

Group stage
On 11 December 2015, International Cricket Council announced the schedule for the tournament with the 10 teams split into 2 groups. Each team played every other team in its group once. The top two teams from each group qualified to the knockout phase.

Group A

Group B

Knockout stage

Semi-finals

Final

Australia were appearing in the World Twenty20 final for a fourth consecutive time (and hoping to claim a fourth consecutive title), whereas the West Indies had only made it as far as the semi-finals in previous tournaments. Both teams had finished second in their groups (to New Zealand and England, respectively), but Australia went into the final as favourites. Australian captain Meg Lanning won the toss and elected to bat, with Australia posting what was regarded as a highly competitive total of 148/5 from their 20 overs. Lanning and Elyse Villani both scored half-centuries, while Ellyse Perry hit two sixes in a quickfire innings of 28 towards the end of the innings.

In response, the West Indian openers Hayley Matthews (66 from 45 balls) and Stafanie Taylor (59 from 57 balls) put on a partnership of 120 runs for the first wicket, setting a new team record for Twenty20 Internationals. Matthews and Taylor were both dismissed within the final five overs, but Deandra Dottin and Britney Cooper combined to carry the West Indies to victory with three balls remaining. Matthews, who turned 18 during the tournament, was named Player of the Match. By winning the tournament, the West Indies became only the fourth team to win a global women's cricket tournament, after Australia, England, and New Zealand. In all World Twenty20 matches, only one higher successful chase has been carried out.

Statistics

Most runs

Most wickets

ICC team of the tournament 
On 4 April 2016, ICC announced the team of the tournament. The selection panel consisted of Geoff Allardice, Ian Bishop, Nasser Hussain, Mel Jones, Sanjay Manjrekar and Lisa Sthalekar.

  Suzie Bates
  Charlotte Edwards
  Meg Lanning
  Stafanie Taylor (c)
  Sophie Devine
  Rachel Priest (wk)
  Deandra Dottin
  Megan Schutt
  Sune Luus
  Leigh Kasperek
  Anya Shrubsole
  Anam Amin (12th woman)

External links

 Cricinfo tournament page

References

 
2015–16 Indian women's cricket
International women's cricket competitions in India
International cricket competitions in 2015–16
March 2016 sports events in India
April 2016 sports events in India
2016 in women's cricket